Joseph William Wilson (29 September 1911 – 3 April 1996) was an English professional footballer who played in the Football League for Southend United, Brentford and Barnsley as a right back. He later managed non-League clubs Blyth Spartans and Consett.

Career

Early years in non-League football 
A right back, Wilson spent his early career moving around Northern and North Eastern League clubs Tow Law Town, Crook Town, Annfield Plain and Stanley United. He departed the latter club in December 1927.

Football League (1927–1947) 
Wilson signed for First Division club Newcastle United for a £50 fee in December 1927. He had to wait until 7 December 1929 for his professional debut, which came in a 2–2 draw with Aston Villa at St James' Park. Wilson departed the club in July 1930 and transferred to Third Division South club Southend United for a £500 fee. He remained at Roots Hall for five seasons and made 175 appearances, scoring four goals. Wilson signed for newly promoted First Division club Brentford in June 1935 and made 23 appearances during the 1935–36 season. He gradually fell out of the first team picture over the following three seasons and departed Griffin Park in August 1939. He made 65 appearances and scored one goal in four years with the Bees.

Wilson transferred Third Division South club Reading in August 1939, but his career was brought to a halt after just three appearances by the outbreak of the Second World War the following month. In May 1946, after the war, Wilson signed for Second Division club Barnsley and made 20 appearances during the 1946–47 season.

Return to non-League football
Wilson ended his playing career with North Eastern League club Blyth Spartans and after initially serving as player-coach, he player-managed the club between 1948 and 1950. He later managed North Eastern League club Consett.

Personal life 
Wilson's son Carl also became a professional footballer and played for Newcastle United, Gateshead, Doncaster Rovers, Millwall and Sparta Rotterdam.

Career statistics

References

1911 births
1996 deaths
People from Tow Law
Footballers from County Durham
English footballers
Association football fullbacks
Tow Law Town F.C. players
Crook Town A.F.C. players
Annfield Plain F.C. players
Stanley United F.C. players
Newcastle United F.C. players
Southend United F.C. players
Brentford F.C. players
Reading F.C. players
Barnsley F.C. players
Blyth Spartans A.F.C. players
Northern Football League players
English Football League players
English football managers
Blyth Spartans A.F.C. managers
Consett A.F.C. managers
Player-coaches